Nina Corti (born 3 August 1953) is a Swiss flamenco dancer and choreographer. In 2007 she was honored by the Swiss government as the first female celebrity to design a stamp for the Swiss Post.

Early life and family 
Nina Corti was born on 3 August 1953. Her father, a musician and soloist with the Tonhalle Orchester Zürich, was of Italian and Spanish ancestry. Her mother, an artist, was of Russian and Polish ancestry. She has two brothers and was introduced to music as a young child. She trained as a goldsmith before receiving a scholarship from the city of Zürich to study classical Spanish dance and flamenco in Madrid and Seville for four years.

Career 

After studying dance in Spain, Corti performed with Pepe Habichuela, Enrique Morente, the Ketamas, Guadiana, Manitas de Plata, the Gipsy Kings, and Pepe Justicia. She has performed at the Semperoper, the Royal Albert Hall, and the Musikverein.

In 2007 Corti designed a stamp for the Swiss Post, becoming the first female celebrity to be awarded the honor. Her stamp featured a flamenco dancer.

In 2012 she became the director of the program Musica y Danza, where she choreographs works in classical Spanish dance and flamenco.

References 

Living people
1953 births
Flamenco dancers
Swiss female dancers
Swiss choreographers
Swiss people of Italian descent
Swiss people of Spanish descent
Swiss people of Polish descent
Swiss people of Russian descent
Entertainers from Zürich
Women choreographers